The ÖBB Class 2043 is a class of diesel-hydraulic locomotives operated by Austrian Federal Railways (ÖBB) in Austria.

Technical specifications
The locomotives have a B-B wheel arrangement, and are powered by Jenbach LM1500 diesel motors. They are equipped with a Voith hydraulic transmission. Four locomotives were retrofitted with a magnetic track brake system.

History
A total of 77 locomotives have been built by Jenbacher Werke. Some locomotives are also operated by Növog.

References

Further reading

External links

ÖBB rolling stock information 

Austrian Federal Railways diesel locomotives